Sno-Caps is a brand of candy consisting of small pieces of semi-sweet chocolate candy covered with white nonpareils. The candy was introduced in the late 1920s by the Blumenthal Chocolate Company. Ward Foods acquired Blumenthal in 1969. The brand was later purchased by the Chicago-based Terson Company in 1981. Nestlé acquired the brand on January 9, 1984, from Terson Company. In 2018 the brand was purchased by Ferrara Candy Company, a division of Ferrero SpA. Sno-Caps can be found around the world, commonly at movie theaters.

Brand name confectionery